This is a list of University of Dhaka alumni and faculty members.

Nobel laureate

 Muhammad Younus , Bangladesh's only Nobel prize winner, awarded the Nobel Peace Prize in 2006

Presidents
 Sheikh Mujibur Rahman, 1st and 4th President and Father of the Nation of Bangladesh but he did not get any degree from the university or attend any class. He was admitted in law, doing full time politics and hardly any time to study anything.
 Syed Nazrul Islam, former acting President of Bangladesh during the Bangladesh Liberation War in 1971
 Mohammad Mohammadullah, 3rd President of Bangladesh
 Khondaker Mostaq Ahmad, 5th President of Bangladesh
 A. F. M. Ahsanuddin Chowdhury, 9th President of Bangladesh
 Hussain Muhammad Ershad, 10th President of Bangladesh
 Abdur Rahman Biswas, 11th President of Bangladesh
 Shahabuddin Ahmed, 12th President of Bangladesh
 A. Q. M. Badruddoza Chowdhury, 13th President of Bangladesh
 Muhammad Jamiruddin Sircar, former acting President of Bangladesh
 Iajuddin Ahmed, 14th President of Bangladesh
 Zillur Rahman, 15th President of Bangladesh
 Abdul Hamid (politician), 16th and incumbent President of Bangladesh

Vice Presidents
 Mirza Nurul Huda, 3rd Vice President of Bangladesh

Prime ministers
 Tajuddin Ahmad, 1st Prime Minister of Bangladesh
 Sheikh Mujibur Rahman, 2nd Prime Minister of Bangladesh
 Mashiur Rahman, former senior minister, with the rank and status of a prime minister
 Ataur Rahman Khan, 5th Prime Minister of Bangladesh
 Moudud Ahmed, 7th Prime Minister of Bangladesh and 6th Vice President of Bangladesh
 Kazi Zafar Ahmed, 8th Prime Minister of Bangladesh
 Sheikh Hasina, 10th and incumbent Prime Minister of Bangladesh in her second term
 Lotay Tshering, 8th and incumbent Prime Minister of Bhutan

Deputy Prime Ministers
 Jamal Uddin Ahmad, Deputy Prime Minister of Bangladesh, 1977–1982

Chief Advisers (Head of the Government)
 Shahabuddin Ahmed, 12th President of Bangladesh, Chief Adviser from 1990 to 1991
 Muhammad Habibur Rahman, 7th Chief Justice of Bangladesh, Chief Adviser in 1996
 Latifur Rahman, 10th Chief Justice of Bangladesh, Chief Adviser in 2001
 Iajuddin Ahmed, 14th President of Bangladesh, Chief Adviser from 2006 to 2007
 Fakhruddin Ahmed, former governor of the Bangladesh Bank, Chief Adviser from 2007 to 2009

Judges of the Supreme Court of Bangladesh

Chief Justices of Bangladesh
 Badrul Haider Chowdhury, 5th Chief Justice of Bangladesh
 Shahabuddin Ahmed, 6th Chief Justice of Bangladesh
 Muhammad Habibur Rahman, 7th Chief Justice of Bangladesh
 Justice Mustafa Kamal, 9th Chief Justice of Bangladesh
 Latifur Rahman, 10th Chief Justice of Bangladesh
 Syed Jillur Rahim Mudasser Husain, 14th Chief Justice of Bangladesh
 Md. Tafazzul Islam, 17th Chief Justice of Bangladesh
 Md. Muzammel Hossain, 20th Chief Justice of Bangladesh

Judges of High Court Division 
 Farah Mahbub, judge
 Amir Hossain,  judge
 Naima Haider, judge

Chairman, National Human Rights Commission 
 Mizanur Rahman

Politics and public service

 AKM Azizul Haque, Minister of Agriculture (1976–1979)
 A M Nurul Islam, private secretary to Prime Minister Sheikh Mujibur Rahman
 Abdus Salam Khan, lawyer and politician, Minister of Public Works and Communication in the East Pakistan provincial cabinet
 Abul Fateh, first foreign secretary of Bangladesh
 Abul Maal Abdul Muhith, Former Finance Minister of Bangladesh
 Anisul Huq, current Minister for Law, Justice and Parliamentary Affairs of Bangladesh
 Asaduzzaman Noor, former Minister of Cultural Affairs of Bangladesh
 Iftekhar Ahmed Chowdhury, former foreign minister of Bangladesh and former Permanent Representative of Bangladesh to the United Nations
 Imran Ahmad, minister of Expatriates' Welfare and Overseas Employment in Bangladesh
 Jahanara Imam, writer and political activist, popularly known as "Shaheed Janani" (Mother of Martyrs)
 Leela Roy, progressive leftist Indian politician and reformer; close associate of Netaji Subhash Chandra Bose; fought with university authorities and became the first woman to be admitted to the University of Dhaka and earn an M.A. degree
 Mainul Hosein, former law minister of Bangladesh
 Matia Chowdhury, former left-wing student leader and NAP politician and current BAL Presidium member and Minister of Agriculture
 Mirza Fakhrul Islam Alamgir, Secretary-General of the Bangladesh Nationalist Party
 Muhiuddin Khan Alamgir, former Minister of Home Affairs of Bangladesh
 Mukhlesur Rahman Chowdhury, former minister; career journalist; former press secretary to the President of Bangladesh
 Nahida Sobhan, Ambassador to Jordan
 Nasima Haider, High Commissioner to South Africa (2005-2007)
 Nurul Islam Nahid, former Minister of Education of Bangladesh
 Obaidul Quader, current Minister of Communications of Bangladesh & current General Secretary of Bangladesh Awami League
 Rashed Khan Menon, current Minister of Tourism and Civil Aviation of Bangladesh
 Raufun Basunia, student leader, was killed during an anti-autocratic protest against military ruler Hussain Muhammad Ershad in 1985.
 Saifur Rahman, former finance minister of Bangladesh. Sulran Ahmed Chowdhury, Ex Deputy Speaker Bangladesh Parliament and former Minister and First Civil Administrator Ctg. Municipal Corporation
 Shah A M S Kibria, diplomat, former finance minister of Bangladesh (1996–2001), former executive secretary of ESCAP
 Sheikh Razzak Ali, founding member of the Bangladesh Nationalist Party, Deputy Speaker and Speaker of Bangladesh Jatiyo Sangsad
 Tabarak Husain, former foreign secretary of Bangladesh
 Tandi Dorji, current Minister of Foreign Affairs of Bhutan
 Tofail Ahmed, former student leader and current BAL Presidum member and Minister of Commerce
 Sheikh Shahidul Islam, former Minister of Education, Public Works, former President Bangladesh Chattra League, current Secretary-General of Jatiya Party.

Science and engineering

Physics

 A. M. Harun-ar-Rashid, physicist, author of many physics books
 Abdul Matin Chowdhury, physicist, ex-Vice Chancellor, University of Dhaka, member, Nobel Committee for Physics
 Kariamanickam Srinivasa Krishnan, FRS, co-discoverer of the Raman Effect in physics
 Khandker Abdul Muttalib,
 Khondkar Siddique-e-Rabbani, physicist
 M Innas Ali, physicist, founder of the Bangladesh Atomic Energy Commission
 M. A. Wazed Miah, physicist
 M. Shamsher Ali, nuclear scientist and educator
 Miftahur Rahman, physicist
 Mohammad Ataul Karim, Executive Vice Chancellor and Provost of the University of Massachusetts Dartmouth IEEE Fellow
 Mohammad Sajjad Alam, particle physicist
 Satyendra Nath Bose, FRS, best known for his work on quantum statistics in the early 1920s.
 Sultana N. Nahar, physicist and astronomer
 Imdadul Haque Khan

Chemistry

 Abdus Suttar Khan, aerospace researcher of NASA and Fellow of the Royal Society of Chemistry, Great Britain
 Abed Chaudhury, geneticist
 Abul Hussam, inventor of the SONO filter for arsenic removal
 Fazlul Halim Chowdhury, chemist, educationalist, ex-Vice Chancellor of the University of Dhaka
 Sasanka Chandra Bhattacharyya - natural product chemist, Shanti Swarup Bhatnagar laureate

Other
. Dr.Mahfujer Rahman,Political Cabinet Deputy Secretary Indo pacific zone. State Deapartment Under U.S.A
 Abul Kalam Azad Chowdhury, Chairman of University Commission of Bangladesh, former Vice-Chancellor of University of Dhaka.
 Bhagawan Koirala, cardiothoracic surgeon
 Fazlur Rahman Khan, pioneering structural engineer and architect; contributed to modern skyscraper design technology. works include Sears Tower and John Hancock Center
 M. Anwar Hossain, biochemist, Vice-Chancellor of Jahangirnagar University, 2012-
 Mir Masoom Ali, George and Frances Ball Distinguished Professor Emeritus of Statistics, Ball State University
 S.M. Ullah, soil scientist and environmentalist who researched arsenic contamination with the Seibersdorf Research Center, Austria.
 Shah M. Faruque, director of the Centre for Food and Water Borne Diseases at the International Centre for Diarrhoeal Disease Research, Bangladesh
 Tirukkannapuram Vijayaraghavan, Mathematician, co-discoverer of Pisot–Vijayaraghavan number
 Zeba Islam Seraj, a Bangladeshi Scientist known for her research in developing salt-tolerant rice varieties suitable for growth in the coastal areas of Bangladesh

Education, philosophy and academia

 Abdullah-Al-Muti Sharfuddin, scientist and science writer
 Abdul Haque Faridi, Educator, lecturer and writer
 Abdur Razzaq, academic and educator
 Abu Nasr Waheed, educationist, was the first head of the Department of Arabic and Islamic Studies.
 Anisuzzaman, academic, professor
 Azfar Hussain, academic, writer, and activist
 Bazlul Chowdhury, Vice-Chancellor of Independent University, Bangladesh
 Farhad Mazhar, writer, social and human rights activist, and environmentalist
 Maqbular Rahman Sarkar, tenth vice-chancellor of Rajshahi University
 Muhammad Asadullah Al-Ghalib, Reformist Islamic Scholar, academic, writer and leader of the religious organisation Ahlehadeeth Movement Bangladesh.
 Govinda Chandra Dev, professor of philosophy at University of Dhaka
 Gowher Rizvi, historian, academic
 Imran Rahman, Vice-Chancellor of the University of Liberal Arts Bangladesh
 Laila Nur, Bangladeshi language-movement activist and academic
 Md. Hasibur Rashid, 5th Vice chancellor of Begum Rokeya University, Rangpur
 M Harunur Rashid, archaeologist, educationist, and museum curator
 M Osman Ghani, scientist, educationist, and academic, 11th vice-chancellor of the University of Dhaka.
 Mohammad Noman, Vice-Chancellor of Jahangirnagar University
 Muhammad Shahidullah, educator, writer, philologist, and linguist
 Muntassir Mamoon, historian, author, translator and professor
 Mohammad Abul Kashem, author, politician, educator, pioneer of the Language Movement
 Niaz Zaman, Bangladeshi academic, writer
 R.C. Majumdar, historian and vice-chancellor of Dacca University
 Sadeka Halim, first woman in Bangladesh to serve as Chief Information Commissioner
 Salimullah Khan, author, essayist, thinker, public intellectual
 Sardar Fazlul Karim, academic, philosopher, and essayist
 Sayed Moazzem Hossain, Academic, Islamic scholar, 6th vice-chancellor of the University of Dhaka.
 Syed Abul Kalam Azad, former treasurer of University of Dhaka
 Wahiduddin Ahmed, thirdthe 3rd vice-chancellor of Bangladesh University of Engineering and Technology                             
 Jasim Uddin Ahmad, 12 th Vice Chancellor, Jahangirnagar University, Recipient of Ekushey Padak,  2006          
 Ehsan H. Feroz - Professor, researcher and author
 Qazi Mu'tasim Billah, former professor at the faculty of Islamic studies

Arts, culture and literature

 Abdul Kadir, poet, awarded Ekushey Padak (1976) and Independence Day Award (1983)
 Abdul Mannan Syed, poet, author and researcher
 Abdullah Abu Sayeed, writer, television presenter, organizer and activist
 Abdullah Al Mamun, playwright, actor and filmmaker
 Abu Hena Mustafa Kamal, a major songwriter of contemporary Bengali, poet, essayist, critic and presenter
 Abu Zafar Obaidullah, poet and civil servant
 Abul Fazal, writer and educationist
 Ahmed Sofa, poet, novelist, writer, critic, translator and intellectual
 Ahsan Habib, cartoonist, writer and editor of Unmad, a satire magazine
 Akhteruzzaman Elias, novelist and short-story writer
 AKM Bazlul Karim, theater personality
 Alamgir Kabir, filmmaker; three of his feature films are featured in the British Film Institute's list of "Top 10 Bangladeshi Films"
 Aly Zaker, actor, director, businessman, Bangladeshi freedom fighter and occasional writer and photographer
 Anwar Pasha, author of 'Rifle, Roti, Awrat (1971), the first novel set on the Bangladesh War of Independence, brutally murdered by Pakistani Army and local collaborators on 14 December 1971 (Martyred Intellectuals Day)
 Asad Chowdhury, poet, writer, translator and journalist
 Bipasha Hayat, actress
 Buddhadeb Bosu, major Bengali writer of the mid-twentieth century, belonging to the Kollol age
 Chanchal Chowdhury, actor
 Debabrata Basu, mathematical statistician
 Dino Shafeek, Bengali actor based in the United Kingdom
 Fakrul Alam, academic, writer, and translator
 Ferdausi Rahman, eminent playback, ghazal and folk singer
 Ferdous Ahmed, actor
 Ferdousi Mazumder, actress
 Firoz Mahmud, contemporary visual artist, painter, and creator
 Ghulam Murshid, author, researcher and journalist
 Golam Mustafa, actor
 Hasnat Abdul Hye, writer and novelist
 Helal Hafiz, poet
 Hosne Ara Shahed, Bengali writer and educationist
 Humayun Ahmed, Bengali novelist, short-story writer and filmmaker
 Humayun Azad, Bengali novelist, poet, essayist and professor
 Ilias Kanchan, filmstar, actor and road-safety activist
 Kabir Chowdhury, academic, essayist, materialist, translator
 Kaiser Hamidul Haq, poet, translator, essayist, critic and academic
 Khan Ataur Rahman, film actor, director, producer, screenplay writer, music composer, and singer
 Khondakar Ashraf Hossain, poet, essayist, translator and editor from Bangladesh
 Kiran Chandra Roy, baul and folk musician and songwriter
 Maksudul Ahsan, artist
 Mobarak Hossain Khan, music researcher, surbahar player
 Muhammed Zafar Iqbal, popular sci-fi writer
 Munier Choudhury, playwright
 Murtaza Bashir, painter
 Nilufar Yasmin, singer
 Natyaguru Nurul Momen, playwright, director, belles letters writer, satirist, personal essayist, lawyer
 Qazi Anwar Hussain, author, publisher and translator
 Qazi Motahar Hossain, author, scientist, statistician and journalist
 Rafiqun Nabi, artist and cartoonist
 Ramendu Majumdar, actor, stage director and theater producer and President of the International Theatre Institute
 Rashid Askari, Bengali-English writer, academic, columnist,fictionist,translator and the 12th Vice Chancellor of Islamic University, Bangladesh
 Rudra Mohammad Shahidullah, poet
 Sabina Yasmin, singer
 Sara Zaker, theater and television actor, entrepreneur and social activist
 Sayeem Rana, Poet, Researcher, Musicologist, Music Director, National film Award 2014
 Serajul Islam Choudhury, literary critic, public intellectual, social analyst, historian, editor, and professor emeritus
 Shafiq Tuhin, lyricist, music director and singer
 Shahidul Zahir, novelist and short-story writer
 Shahidullah Kaiser, major Bengali novelist and Dhaka University professor, brutally murdered by Pakistani Army and local collaborators on 14 December 1971 (Martyred Intellectuals Day)
 Shahriar Kabir, novelist, journalist, filmmaker and human rights activist
 Shamsur Rahman, Bengali poet, columnist and journalist
 Shishir Bhattacharjee, artist
 Shuvro Dev, musician
 Suborna Mustafa, television and film actress
 Syed Abul Maksud, author, columnist, research scholar, and essayist
 Syed Ali Ahsan, poet and author
 Syed Manzoorul Islam, academic, writer, novelist, translator, columnist, and critic
 Tahsan Rahman Khan, singer, keyboardist, guitarist, composer, lyricist, actor, anchor and teacher
 Tanvir Mokammel, Bengali filmmaker, and author
 Tareque Masud, independent film director, film producer, screenwriter and lyricist
 Taslima Akhter, activist and photographer
 Taslima Nasrin, atheist writer
 Waheedul Haq, journalist, writer, musicologist and founder of Chhayanaut
 Zahir Raihan, filmmaker and noted novelist and short-story writer
 Zobeda Khanum, writer

Journalism and media
 Altaf Husain, founding editor of Dawn Newspaper
 Haroon Habib, Chief Editor and Managing Director of Bangladesh Sangbad Sangstha (BSS)
 Kaberi Gayen, journalist and columnist for The Daily Star
 Mahbub Anam, former editor of the Bangladesh Times
 Mahbub Jamal Zahedi, establishing newspaper editor of the Khaleej Times
 Mahfuz Anam, editor of The Daily Star
 Matiur Rahman, editor of Daily Prothom Alo
 Mishuk Munier, former CEO and Chief Editor of satellite TV channel ATN News
 Nurul Kabir, editor of The New Age
 Riaz Uddin Ahmed, awarded Ekushey Padak for journalism
 Shykh Seraj, news director at Channel i
 Khaled Muhiuddin, head of the German-based international media Deutsche Welle Bangla Department
 Muhammad Ziauddin, Pakistani journalist, economist and historian

Games and sports
 AKM Nowsheruzzaman, international footballer
 Athar Ali Khan, former international cricketer and cricket commentator
 Jahurul Islam, international cricketer
 Kaiser Hamid, international footballer
 Manzur Hasan Mintu, international footballer who played for Pakistan
 Mosharraf Hossain, international cricketer
 Musa Ibrahim, first Bangladeshi to summit Mount Everest
 Sayeed Hassan Kanan, international footballer
 Shahriar Nafees, international cricketer
 Ziaur Rahman, chess player from Bangladesh and the second Grandmaster of the country
 Zulfiker Mahmud Mintu, international footballer

Chiefs of Forces
 Lieutenant General H M Ershad, 5th Chief of Army Staff of Bangladesh
 Lieutenant General Hasan Mashhud Chowdhury, 13th Chief of Army Staff of Bangladesh
 General Abu Belal Muhammad Shafiul Huq, 17th Chief of Army Staff of Bangladesh

Business
 Abul Barkat, economist, former chairman of state-owned Janata Bank and former chairperson of Department of Economics, Dhaka University
 Abul Khair Litu, Chairman of the Bengal Foundation
 Chandra Shekhar Ghosh, Chairman Managing Director of Bandhan Bank, India
 Mohammad Shahjahan, Acting Managing Director of Grameen Bank
 Samson H. Chowdhury, entrepreneur and former chairman of Astras Ltd. and Square (Bangladesh)
 Syed Humayun Kabir, philanthropist and chairman of Renata Limited
 Syed Manzur Elahi, Chairman of Apex Group

Others
 Sir Fazle Hasan Abed, founder of BRAC, 1980 Ramon Magsaysay awardee for Community Leadership
 Tahrunessa Abdullah, 1978 Ramon Magsaysay awardee for Community Leadership

References

University of Dhaka
University of Dhaka people
Dhaka-related lists
Dhaka, University of Dhaka